Qaysān or Qeissan or Qēssan is a village in Blue Nile State, south-eastern Sudan on the border with Ethiopia.

References

Populated places in Blue Nile (state)
Ethiopia–Sudan border crossings
Villages in Sudan